Crustaceana is a peer-reviewed scientific journal specialising in carcinology. It was established in 1960 and is published monthly by Brill Publishers. The journal is abstracted and indexed by BIOSIS Previews, the Science Citation Index, The Zoological Record, and GeoRef. According to the Journal Citation Reports, the journal has a 2011 impact factor of 0.464.

The journal is edited by J.C. von Vaupel Klein. It charges an unspecified publication fee from authors of all regular papers, and an optional open access fee of USD 1830.

References

External links 

Carcinology journals
Publications established in 1960
Monthly journals
Brill Publishers academic journals
English-language journals
Hybrid open access journals